Stadion Miejski w Starachowicach (English: Municipal Stadium in Starachowice) – multi-use stadium in Starachowice, Poland.

History
It was built in the years 1956–1961 and can seat up to 15,000 spectators. On July 15, 2001, on the occasion of the celebration of the 75th anniversary of the Star Starachowice club, a match for the Polish SuperCup took place at the stadium (Wisła Kraków - Polonia Warsaw 4–3).

It was also a home for Juventa Starachowice (dissolved in 2013).

References

Starachowice